Palliolum is a genus of scallops, marine bivalve molluscs in the family Pectinidae, the scallops.

This genus is known in the fossil record from the Eocene to the Quaternary  (age range: 37.2 to 0.012 million years ago).

Species
Species within the genus Lissochlamys include:
 Palliolum cibaoense † Waller 2011
 Palliolum excisum †  (Bronn, 1831) 
 Palliolum gerardi †  Nyst 1835
 Palliolum guersi  Wienrich 1999
 Palliolum incomparabile  (Risso, 1826) 
 Palliolum mellevillei †  d'Orbigny 1850
 Palliolum minutulum  Dijkstra & Southgate, 2000 
 Palliolum striatum  (O. F. Müller, 1776) 
 Palliolum tigerinum  (O. F. Müller, 1776) 
 Palliolum tigrinum †  Müller 1776

References

Pectinidae
Bivalve genera